Stockyard is a rural locality in the Lockyer Valley Region, Queensland, Australia.

History 
Spring Park Provisional School opened on 1918. It became Spring Park State School on 1 April 1924. The school closed in 1928. By 1935, the school building, described as being on West Egypt Road (which does not exist on current maps), had been sold to Mr Dyer of Rockmount. He attempted to move the building but was unable to do so due to the condition of the roads.

References 

Lockyer Valley Region
Localities in Queensland